Isaac "Ike" Berger (November 16, 1936 – June 4, 2022) was an American weightlifter, who competed for the United States at the 1956, 1960 and 1964 Olympics and won one gold and two silver medals. He held eight world records (four official and four unofficial), and won the United States national title eight times.

Berger was born to a rabbi in Jerusalem, where he studied in a yeshiva.  He immigrated to the United States when he was in his teens, and became a naturalized American citizen in December 1955.

He twice won the world championships and the Pan American Games. 

In his gold medal performance at the 1957 Maccabiah Games, Berger was the first (and only one until 1998) athlete to set a world record on Israeli land in any sport. He pressed .

Berger was named to the United States Weightlifters Hall of Fame in 1965, and the International Jewish Sports Hall of Fame in 1980. He died on June 4, 2022.

See also
 List of select Jewish weightlifters

References

External links

 
 
 
 

1936 births
2022 deaths
American male weightlifters
Olympic gold medalists for the United States in weightlifting
Olympic silver medalists for the United States in weightlifting
Weightlifters at the 1956 Summer Olympics
Weightlifters at the 1960 Summer Olympics
Weightlifters at the 1964 Summer Olympics
Medalists at the 1956 Summer Olympics
Medalists at the 1960 Summer Olympics
Medalists at the 1964 Summer Olympics
World Weightlifting Championships medalists
Pan American Games gold medalists for the United States
Pan American Games medalists in weightlifting
Weightlifters at the 1959 Pan American Games
Weightlifters at the 1963 Pan American Games
Maccabiah Games medalists in weightlifting
Maccabiah Games gold medalists for the United States
Competitors at the 1957 Maccabiah Games
Naturalized citizens of the United States
Israeli emigrants to the United States
Israeli Jews
Jewish American sportspeople
Jewish weightlifters
Sportspeople from Jerusalem
Medalists at the 1959 Pan American Games
Medalists at the 1963 Pan American Games
21st-century American Jews